CFMF-FM is a French language community radio station that operates at 103.1 FM in Fermont, Quebec, Canada.

History
The station was launched on September 15, 1979 on 103.1 MHz, with an effective radiated power of 20 watts. It was licensed to Radio Communautaire de Fermont Inc.

The station is a member of the Association des radiodiffuseurs communautaires du Québec.

External links
CFMF
Listen Live
CFMF-FM history - Canadian Communications Foundation

Fmf
Fmf
Fmf
Year of establishment missing